Protestants are less than 1% of the population of Uzbekistan.
The Evangelical Lutheran Church in Uzbekistan is a church of seven congregations.
The seat of the bishop of Tashkent.
The president of the synod is Gilda Raspopowa.

Denominations 
 Baptist Union in Uzbekistan
 German Evangelical Lutheran Church
 Korean Baptist Churches
 Korean Methodist Church
 Korean Presbyterian Church

See also 
Religion in Uzbekistan
Christianity in Uzbekistan

References 

 

af:Protestante in Oesbekistan